Gossia pubiflora is a species of plant in the family Myrtaceae that is endemic to coastal central east Queensland.

Description 
The bark is rough and flaky being light brown or gray in colour. Flowers have 5 petals, petals are yellowish white and measure  in length, hypanthium is cup shaped and is a greenish brown colour.

Distribution 
Gossia pubiflora is endemic to coastal central east Queensland, which is south of Townsville and north of Rockhampton. Based on the records of the Australasian Virtual Herbarium records, its main population occurs in the Airlie Beach region.

References 

Myrtales of Australia
Trees of Australia
Flora of Queensland
pubiflora